Pamela Zave (born 1948) is an American computer scientist now working at Princeton University. She is known for her work on requirements engineering, telecommunication services, and protocol modeling and verification, and is now working on network architecture. She was named a Fellow of the Association for Computing Machinery in 2002, and was the 2017 recipient of the Harlan D. Mills Award from the IEEE Computer Society.

Education and career
Zave graduated from Cornell University with a bachelor's degree in English, in 1970. She earned her doctorate in computer science from the University of Wisconsin–Madison in 1976, under the name Pamela Zave Smith; her thesis, "Functional equivalence of parallel processes", was supervised by Donald R. Fitzwater. She taught at the University of Maryland, College Park from 1975 to 1981, and then joined Bell Labs (which was then part of AT&T). She remained in the AT&T part of the Labs through the two corporate splits that formed Bellcore in 1984 and Lucent in 1996, and
continued working at AT&T Labs Research through 2017. Since then she has been a research associate at Princeton University.

Awards and honors
In 2017 Zave received the Harlan D. Mills Award from the IEEE Computer Society "for groundbreaking use of formal methods in the development of telecommunication software and for enduring contributions to software engineering theory."

In 2002 Zave was named a Fellow of the Association for Computing Machinery "for encouraging the use of formal methods in the development of telecommunication software through influential research, tool development, large case studies, and professional education." She was also selected as an AT&T Fellow in 2009.

Research on requirements engineering

In collaboration with Michael A. Jackson, Zave created the set of definitions and reasoning obligations that have become known as the standard model for requirements engineering. The model is most fully explained in the paper "Four dark corners of requirements engineering." Earlier papers on this work won the Ten-Year Most Influential Paper Award from three conferences: 11th International Requirements Engineering Symposium (2003), 27th International Conference on Software Engineering (2005), and 18th IEEE Conference on Requirements Engineering (2010).

Research on telecommunication services

Distributed Feature Composition (DFC) is a modular architecture for telecommunication services, designed to provide structured feature composition and easy management of feature interactions. DFC was invented by Zave and Michael Jackson beginning in 1997.

An implementation of DFC was used to build the features for CallVantage (SM), AT&T's first voice-over-IP service, which became publicly available in 2004 and served approximately 100,000 customers world-wide.
After CallVantage the DFC implementation was used to build a teleconferencing system used internally by AT&T, which for some time supported millions of user minutes each work day. DFC has also been incorporated into the Java Community Process standard for SIP Servlet containers.

Zave holds 30 patents in the telecommunications area.
Her papers on telecommunications research have won three Best Paper Awards:
IEEE Software best paper of 1989 for "A compositional approach to multiparadigm programming",
7th International Workshop on Feature Interactions in Telecommunications and Software Systems (2003),
3rd International Conference on Principles, Systems and Applications of IP Telecommunications (2009).

Research on protocol modeling and verification

Zave's work on finding bugs in the Chord protocol
and proving a modified version correct
has been credited by engineers in Amazon Web Services for convincing them to start using formal methods on real distributed systems.

Personal
In 2014 Zave married her partner, the Cuban-American artist Yolanda V. Fundora. She is a quilter.

See also
SailFin

References

External links
Research Home Page

1948 births
Living people
American computer scientists
Cornell University alumni
Fellows of the Association for Computing Machinery
American LGBT scientists
Lesbian scientists
Lesbians
Quilters
Textile artists
University of Maryland, College Park faculty
University of Wisconsin–Madison alumni
American women computer scientists
LGBT academics
21st-century American women